Heinrich Thoma (16 October 1900 – 16 October 1982) was a Swiss rower who competed in the 1924 Summer Olympics. In 1924 he won the bronze medal with his partner Rudolf Bosshard in the double scull event.

References

External links
 profile

1900 births
1982 deaths
Swiss male rowers
Olympic bronze medalists for Switzerland
Olympic rowers of Switzerland
Rowers at the 1924 Summer Olympics
Olympic medalists in rowing
Medalists at the 1924 Summer Olympics
European Rowing Championships medalists